Luís de Meneses (14 July 1902 – 10 June 1978) was a Portuguese equestrian. He competed in two events at the 1924 Summer Olympics.

References

External links
 

1902 births
1978 deaths
Portuguese male equestrians
Olympic equestrians of Portugal
Equestrians at the 1924 Summer Olympics
People from Santarém, Portugal
Sportspeople from Santarém District